The Lal Keshwar Shiv Mandir is a Hindu Temple in the city of Hajipur in Bihar, India. Dedicated to Lord Shiva, it is located at Bagmusa (Hajipur), Vaishali  As per local folklore, it is said to have been in existence since ancient period and Lord Shiva is believed to be in the form of Lingam here. Apart from anthropomorphic images of Shiva, the worship of Shiva in the form of a lingam, or linga, is also important. The worship of the Shiva-Linga originated from the famous hymn in the Atharva-Veda Samhitâ sung in praise of the Yupa-Stambha, the sacrificial post.

Shiva temples in Bihar
Hindu temples in Bihar
Vaishali district
Hajipur